Magnuson is a patronymic surname of Scandinavian origin, meaning "son of Magnus". It may refer to:

People
Algot Magnuson of Revsnes (c.1355–c.1426), Swedish magnate, and castellan of Styresholm
Ann Magnuson (born 1956), American actress
Princess Christina, Mrs. Magnuson (born 1943), sister of the King of Sweden
Christine Magnuson (born 1985), American swimmer 
Donald H. Magnuson (1911–1979), U.S. representative from Washington State
E. Herman Magnuson (1894–1955), New York politician
Hugo Magnuson (1900–2003), American businessman and politician from North Dakota; founder of Hugo's grocery store chain
Jim Magnuson (1946–1991) was a Major League Baseball pitcher
Keith Magnuson (1947–2003), Canadian professional ice hockey player
Paul A. Magnuson (born 1937), United States District Judge from Minnesota
Quinn Magnuson (born 1971), Canadian football player, see 1993 CFL Draft
Warren Magnuson (1905–1989), American politician from Washington State; U.S. senator 1944–81
Trystan Magnuson (born 1985), Major League Baseball pitcher

Other
Magnuson Act, Chinese Exclusion Repeal Act of 1943
Magnuson Park, in the Sand Point neighborhood of Seattle
Magnuson Computer Systems, manufacturer of IBM-compatible mainframes
Magnuson Hotels

Swedish-language surnames
Patronymic surnames